Thom Demijohn was a joint pseudonym used by authors Thomas M. Disch and John Sladek for their satirical novel Black Alice (1968).

Demijohn
American male novelists
20th-century American male writers